Ski orienteering (SkiO) is a cross-country skiing endurance winter racing sport and one of the four orienteering disciplines recognized by the IOF. A successful ski orienteer combines high physical endurance, strength and excellent technical skiing skills with the ability to navigate and make the best route choices while skiing at a high speed.

Standard orienteering maps are commonly used, but since 2019, a separate mapping standard ISSkiOM has been produced which recommends a subset of the symbols used in other disciplines. Ski-orienteering maps uses green symbols to indicate trails and tracks and different symbols to indicate their navigability in snow; other symbols indicate whether any roads are snow-covered or clear. Navigation tactics is similar to mountain bike orienteering. Standard skate-skiing equipment is used, along with a map holder attached to the chest. Compared to cross-country skiing, upper body strength is more important because of double-poling needed along narrow snow trails.

Events

Ski orienteering events are designed to test both physical strength and navigation skills of the athletes. Ski orienteers use the map to navigate a dense ski track network in order to visit a number of control points in the shortest possible time. The track network is printed on the map, and there is no marked route in the terrain. The control points must be visited in the right order. The map gives all information the athlete needs in order to decide which route is the fastest, including the quality and width of the tracks. The athlete has to take hundreds of route choice decisions at high speed during every race: a slight lack of concentration for just a hundredth of a second may cost the medal. Ski orienteering is time-measured and objective. The clock is the judge: fastest time wins. The electronic card verifies that the athlete has visited all control points in the right order.

International competitions
The World Ski Orienteering Championships is the official event to award the titles of World Champions in Ski Orienteering. The World Championships is organized every odd year. The programme includes Sprint, Middle and Long Distance competitions, and a Relay for both men and women.

The World Cup is the official series of events to find the world's best ski orienteers over a season. The World Cup is organized every even year.

Junior World Ski Orienteering Championships and World Masters Ski Orienteering Championships are organized annually.

World-wide sport 
Ski orienteering is practiced on four continents. The events take place in the natural environment, over a variety of outdoor terrains, from city parks to countryside fields, forests and mountain sides - wherever there is snow. The leading ski orienteering regions are Asia, Europe and North America.

National teams from 35 countries are expected to participate in the next World Ski Orienteering Championships to be held in Sweden in March 2011. Ski orienteering is on the programme of the Asian Winter Games and the CISM World Military Winter Games. The IOF has applied for inclusion of ski orienteering in the 2018 Olympic Winter Games and will also apply to FISU for inclusion in the 2013 Winter Universiades.

World Rankings

, the highest ranked male ski-orienteerers are: 
{| class="wikitable" style="text-align: center;"
|-
!Rank
!Name
!Country
!Points
|-
|1
|align="left"|Erik Rost
|align="left"|
|6995
|-
|2
|align="left"|Sergey Gorlanov
|align="left"|
|6967
|-
|3
|align="left"|Lars Moholdt
|align="left"|
|6963
|-
|4
|align="left"|Vladislav Kiselev
|align="left"|
|6818
|-
|5
|align="left"|Eduard Khrennikov
|align="left"|
|6746
|-
|6
|align="left"|Stanimir Belomazhev
|align="left"|
|6706
|-
|7
|align="left"|Gion Schnyder
|align="left"|
|6641
|-
|8
|align="left"|Erik Blomgren
|align="left"|
|6631
|-
|9
|align="left"|Tuomas Kotro
|align="left"|
|6552
|-
|10
|align="left"|Tero Linnainmaa
|align="left"|
|6544
|-
|11
|align="left"|Jyri Uusitalo
|align="left"|
|6506
|-
|12
|align="left"|Andrey Lamov
|align="left"|
|6501
|-
|13
|align="left"|Jorgen Madslien
|align="left"|
|6481
|-
|14
|align="left"|Bjornar Kvale
|align="left"|
|6445
|-
|15
|align="left"|Petr Horvat
|align="left"|
|6372
|-
|16
|align="left"|Martin Hammarberg
|align="left"|
|6356
|-
|17
|align="left"|Janne Hakkinen
|align="left"|
|6345
|-
|18
|align="left"|Oyvind Wiggen
|align="left"|
|6226
|-
|19
|align="left"|Jorgen Baklid
|align="left"|
|6224
|-
|20
|align="left"|Jakub Skoda
|align="left"|
|6221
|-
|21
|align="left"|Mattis Jaama
|align="left"|
|5959
|-
|22
|align="left"|Radek Laciga
|align="left"|
|5930
|-
|23
|align="left"|Audun Heimdal
|align="left"|
|5910
|-
|24
|align="left"|Martin Penchev
|align="left"|
|5712
|-
|25
|align="left"|Rasmus Wickbom
|align="left"|
|5642

Equipment

A person taking part in competitions in ski orienteering is equipped with:
Clothing adequate for cross-country skiing, boots and skis and ski poles.

An orienteering map provided by the organizer, showing the control points which must be visited in order. The map is designed to give all the information the competitor needs to decide which route is the fastest, such as the quality of the tracks, gradient and distance. Green lines on the map show a trail suited to race on skis. Depending on the thickness and continuity of the lines, the competitor makes decisions about which route is the fastest between control points.
Map holder: a map holder attached to the chest makes it possible to view the map while skiing at full speed.
 Optionally lighter type of compass is attached to the map holder or to the skier's arm.
 An electronic punching chip (see orienteering control point).

Bid for inclusion in 2018 Winter Olympic Games

The International Orienteering Federation (IOF) had applied for ski orienteering to be included in the programme of the 2018 Olympic Winter Games. However this was unsuccessful.
In the past few years, ski orienteering has grown considerably in terms of global spread. The growth has been boosted by the inclusion of ski orienteering into the Asian Winter Games and the CISM World Military Winter Games.

References

External links

International Orienteering Federation  
Ski orienteering presentation (Background material to the Press Release: Ski orienteering bids for inclusion in the 2018 Olympic Winter Games)  (August 31, 2010)
(June 11, 2008)

 
Orienteering
Orienteering
Multisports
Orienteering
Snow sports